Kenny  Nagera (born 21 February 2002) is a French professional footballer who plays as a forward for Championnat National 2 side Lorient B, on loan from Ligue 1 side Paris Saint-Germain.

Career 
Nagera began his footballing career at the Académie de Football d'Épinay-sur-Seine. He joined the Paris Saint-Germain Academy in 2015. On 29 June 2020, he signed his first professional contract with Paris Saint-Germain (PSG), tying him to the club until 2023. On 10 April 2021, Nagera made his professional debut for PSG, coming on as a substitute for Kylian Mbappé in a 4–1 win over Strasbourg. On 18 June, he signed a contract extension with the club that would extend his contract until 2025.

On 3 August 2021, Nagera signed for Ligue 2 club Bastia on loan until the end of the season. However, after having made only six appearances for the club, his loan in Corsica was cut short; on 17 January 2022, he joined Championnat National side Avranches on loan until the end of the season.

On 30 August 2022, Nagera was loaned to Lorient, joining the club's reserve side in the Championnat National 2.

Personal life 
Nagera is of Guadeloupean and French Guianese descent. As of 2021, his brother Kemryk plays in the youth academy of Lille.

Career statistics

References

External links 
 
 
 

2002 births
Living people
French footballers
French people of Guadeloupean descent
Black French sportspeople
Association football forwards
Sportspeople from Argenteuil
Paris Saint-Germain F.C. players
SC Bastia players
US Avranches players
FC Lorient players
Ligue 1 players
Ligue 2 players
Championnat National players

Championnat National 3 players
Footballers from Val-d'Oise